Elizabeth SC is an American soccer club based in Union County, New Jersey that is an inactive member of the Cosmopolitan Soccer League.

History 

Elizabeth SC was founded in 1924 as Elizabeth Germans in Elizabeth, New Jersey by a group of German immigrants who shared a passion for the game of soccer.  The club immediately joined the German American Soccer League, now the Cosmopolitan Soccer League.  In 1940, the Liberty Sport Club merged into Elizabeth SC.  In the 1940s, the club started divisions for fencing, track and field, handball and bowling.  

In the post-World War II era, Elizabeth SC experienced a tremendous growth in membership, which, in turn, resulted in success in the club's athletic teams.  In 1949, the club would capture the U.S. Amateur Cup.  Over next few years, the club would start a Ladies Auxiliary and expand its youth movement.  Additionally, in 1960 and 1961, the club's handball division would win the U.S. championships.  

In 1965, Elizabeth SC purchased its long-time playing field and clubhouse, Farcher's Grove, through a holding corporation. The club's soccer program reached new heights in 1970 when the club won the National Challenge Cup.  The club would again win the National Cup in 1972.  The club also won two league championships in the 1970s as well as the New Jersey State Cup.  

In the 1980s, the club's youth program, the Union Lancers, won the Under-19 championships in 1987 and 1988.  In 1989, Elizabeth SC won the New Jersey State Cup for the last time.  In 1999, Farcher's Grove was sold and the club was left without a playing field.  After searching for other options, the club suspended its athletic activities.  The club remains an inactive member of the Cosmopolitan Soccer League and continues to meet regularly.  

In 1970 and 1972 the Elizabeth Sport Club won the National Challenge Cup.
Below is a list of players who played on the ESC team.

1970 
Elizabeth SC vs. Croatia of Los Angeles
2–1

Starting lineup for Elizabeth:

Andy Tutulic
Norbert Vollmer
Mario Gonzalez
Albert Burkhard
Billy O’Donnell
Manfred Schellscheidt
Baba Daniels
Frank O’Donnell
Heinz Teska
Chardin Delices
Hector Yanez

subs:
Garry Sacko
Erich Neudecker
Victor Gamaldo

1972
Elizabeth S.C. vs. San Pedro Yugoslavs
1–0

Starting Line up:
Andy Tutulic
Mario Gonzalez
Norbert Vollmer
Tim Feeny
Barry Matty
Abe Wolanow
Manfred Schellscheidt
Miguel Gonzalez
Chardin Delices
Gary Sacko
Walter Smotolocha

Subs:
Sean Tracy
Mario Barca
George Chapla
Eric Fraser
Jerry Cerrigone
Victor Gamaldo
Mave Metchick

Honors 
 National Challenge Cup winners (2): 1970, 1972
 National Amateur Cup winners (1): 1949
 Cosmopolitan Soccer League Champions (7): 1938, 1947, 1948, 1949, 1953, 1971, 1973
 New Jersey State Cup Winners (7): 1950, 1952, 1955, 1967, 1968, 1970, 1989
Participations in CONCACAF Champions' Cup: 1971

References

Weblinks
 Team Info by Cosmopolitan Soccer League

German-American Soccer League
Cosmopolitan Soccer League
Diaspora soccer clubs in the United States
Defunct soccer clubs in New Jersey
1924 establishments in New Jersey
1999 disestablishments in New Jersey
Organizations based in Elizabeth, New Jersey
U.S. clubs in CONCACAF Champions' Cup
U.S. Open Cup winners
American handball clubs